The 1949 All Powers Long Handicap was a motor race staged at the Mount Panorama Circuit near Bathurst in New South Wales, Australia on 18 April 1949.
It was contested over 25 laps, a total distance of approximately 100 miles.
The race utilised a handicap start with the last car commencing 18 minutes and 30 seconds after the first cars.

The race was won by Arthur Rizzo driving a Rizzo Riley.

Results

Notes
 Attendance: Over 20,000
 Race distance: 25 laps, 100 miles
 Race format: Handicap start
 Starters: 23
 Finishers: 11
 Fastest lap: Frank Kleinig, 3 min 7 secs (74.6 mph)
 Fastest time: Frank Kleinig, 1 hr 21 min 8 secs (71.6 mph)
 Luke, Thame & Tubman were flagged off at the expiration of the race time limit

References

External links
 Bathurst Car Championships, The Canberra Times, Tuesday 19 April 1949, page 2, trove.nla.gov.au

All Powers Long Handicap
Motorsport in Bathurst, New South Wales
All Powers Long Handicap